Cannabis in Saint Lucia is legal, up to 30 grams. Cannabis is the only drug grown locally on Saint Lucia, and meets 20% of the local demand, with the remainder coming from the other Caribbean island, predominantly Jamaica and St Vincent, and more developed countries such as the United States. Also, a significant portion is shipped in from countries in south America such as Columbia and Venezuela.

Decriminalization
The use of Cannabis was decriminalized in Saint Lucia on September 14, 2021 for up to of 30 grams

References

Saint Lucia
Drugs in Saint Lucia
Saint Lucia
Saint Lucia